Eulengebirgsbahn AG was a Silesian railway company. In 1899-1903 it gradually built a railway line connecting Reichenbach (today Dzierżoniów) with Wünschelburg (Radków). Regular traffic on the line was abolished, the section from Ścinawka Średnia (Mittelsteine) to Słupiec (Schlegel) still serves as an industrial siding for the local gabbro mine.

See also

Owl Mountains
Kleinbahn
List of former German railway companies

References

External links
 

Defunct railway companies